Wild Cup Soccer is an arcade-style soccer video game developed by Teque London and published by Millennium Interactive for the Commodore Amiga and Amiga CD32 in 1994. It is the second and last entry in the Brutal Sports Series franchise, which started with its predecessor Brutal Sports Football in 1993.

Release 
A conversion of the game was in development and planned to be published by Telegames for Atari Jaguar in February/April 1995, however, it was never released.

See also
Hall of Light
Lemon Amiga

References

External links 
 Wild Cup Soccer at GameFAQs
 Wild Cup Soccer at Giant Bomb
 Wild Cup Soccer at MobyGames

1994 video games
Amiga games
Association football video games
Cancelled Atari Jaguar games
Amiga CD32 games
Fantasy sports video games
Multiplayer and single-player video games
Science fiction video games
Sports fiction
Teque London games
Video games developed in the United Kingdom
Video games set in the future